Voznesenskoye Urban Settlement is the name of several municipal formations in Russia.

Voznesenskoye Urban Settlement, a municipal formation corresponding to Voznesenskoye Settlement Municipal Formation, an administrative division of Podporozhsky District of Leningrad Oblast
Voznesenskoye Urban Settlement, a municipal formation which the Work Settlement of Voznesenskoye in Voznesensky District of Nizhny Novgorod Oblast is incorporated as

See also
Voznesensky (disambiguation)

References

Notes

Sources

